NTL may refer to:

Companies 

 NTL Incorporated and NTL Internet, later Virgin Media, communications media company
 NTL Ireland, later Virgin Media Ireland
 Arqiva, UK company formerly NTL Broadcast and National Transcommunications Limited

Academia 

 National Training Laboratories, Alexandria, Virginia, US, psychology center
 National Transportation Library, US

Code 
 Netley railway station, Eastleigh, England, National Rail station code
 Newcastle Airport (New South Wales), Australia, IATA code
 Notylia, a genus of orchids
 Air Anatolia 1996-2002, ICAO code

Sport 

 Former National Tennis League
 National Touch League, a touch rugby competition, Australia

Other 
 Nevertheless (band), a Christian rock band
 Number Theory Library, a computer library
 Normal Tidal Limit in a river affected by tides
 Ntl (trigraph),  used in the Xhosa language to write the sound /ntɬʼ/
 Norsk Tjenestemannslag, a Norwegian trade union